California's 10th district may refer to:

 California's 10th congressional district
 California's 10th State Assembly district
 California's 10th State Senate district